Oliver Demming (18 April 1928 – August 1999) was a Trinidadian cricketer. He played in four first-class matches for Trinidad and Tobago from 1951 to 1954.

See also
 List of Trinidadian representative cricketers

References

External links
 

1928 births
1999 deaths
Trinidad and Tobago cricketers